Doom Troopers is a video game released in 1995 by Adrenalin Entertainment for the Super NES and Mega Drive/Genesis gaming systems.

Gameplay
Doom Troopers is a platform shooter similar to the Contra series that is based on the Doomtrooper collectible card game, part of the Mutant Chronicles franchise.

The player assumes the role of one of two commandos fighting an evil horde of invading zombies and mutants. The game features eight different levels and the ability of two players to play cooperatively.

The game was known for depicting blood and mutilations of the enemies killed. For example, the common enemies in the first level are usually decapitated before they die.

Reception
Air Hendrix of GamePro panned the Genesis version, criticizing the small selection of attacks, generally simplistic action, lack of color and detail, and unintentionally humorous death screams.

Reviews
Sega-16.com - Aug 18, 2004
SuperGamePower - Dec, 1996 (Portuguese)
Classic-games.net - Nov 19, 2021
All Game Guide - 1995

References

External links

1995 video games
Post-apocalyptic video games
Run and gun games
Sega Genesis games
Super Nintendo Entertainment System games
Video games developed in the United States